Harpley may mean:

Harpley, Worcestershire, a village in Worcestershire, England
Harpley, Norfolk, a village in Norfolk, England